Amina Rani Kilegefaanu or Aminath Rani Kilegefan (born circa 1745 – died after 1759) was princess regent of the Maldives in the absence of her father Muhammad Imaduddin III in 1754–1757, and Sultana regnant in 1757–1759.

Life
Amina was the daughter of Sultan Muhammad Imaduddin III. In 1752, her father was taken captive by Ali Raja of Cannanore and imprisoned in Kavaratti island in the Laccadives, and Male was occupied by the Malabars of Cannanore. After 17 weeks of occupation, Male was freed from the Malabars by Muleegey Dom Hassan Maniku, also called Hassan Manikfan. Her adult paternal as well as maternal cousin, Amina I, was placed on the throne as regent, with Hassan Manikfan as de facto co-regent.

Reign
In 1754, her cousin Amina I abdicated, and Amina II was named nominal princess regent for her absent father at the age of nine, with Hassan Manikfan as de facto co-regent. When her absent father Muhammad Imaduddin III died in 1757, Amina II succeed him as monarch and was proclaimed queen and Sultana of the Maldives with Hassan Manikfan as her regent. She was about twelve years old at her succession.

In 1759, queen Amina was deposed in favor of her paternal uncle Hasan 'Izz ud-din. Her successor was described as kind to his royal relatives, and Amina reportedly "received great respect" by him.

References

External links
 History of the Maldives

18th-century sultans of the Maldives
18th-century women rulers
Year of birth uncertain